The 1985–86 Bulgarian Hockey League season was the 34th season of the Bulgarian Hockey League, the top level of ice hockey in Bulgaria. Five teams participated in the league, and HK CSKA Sofia won the championship.

Regular season

Final 
 HK CSKA Sofia - Levski-Spartak Sofia 2:3/5:2

External links
 Season on hockeyarchives.info

Bulgaria
Bulgarian Hockey League seasons
Bulg